The Little Bay Bridge, or Little Bay Bridges, are a pair of four-lane girder bridges that carry a concurrency of U.S. Route 4, NH Route 16, and the Spaulding Turnpike across the mouth of Little Bay where it meets the Piscataqua River, between the city of Dover and the town of Newington in New Hampshire. As of August 2019, the bridges carry seven motor vehicle lanes with four shoulders, and one non-motorized multi-use path while the General Sullivan Bridge is closed.

Capt. John F. Rowe Bridge
The first Little Bay Bridge, which consists of a pair of two-lane spans, is officially the Capt. John F. Rowe Bridge. Its first span was opened in 1966 and originally carried northbound traffic, with southbound traffic utilizing the parallel General Sullivan Bridge, which had been completed in 1934.

The second span of the Rowe bridge was opened in 1984. At that time, the General Sullivan Bridge was permanently closed to vehicle traffic, southbound traffic was moved to the 1966 span of the Rowe bridge, and the 1984 span of the Rowe bridge was used for northbound traffic.

A second Little Bay Bridge was completed in 2013, with traffic shifted to it so the Rowe bridge could be closed for renovations. Renovations were completed in November 2015, although the Rowe bridge remained closed for several years due to significant realignment work on the nearby U.S. Route 4 interchange. Northbound traffic returned to the Rowe bridge in December 2018. Northbound traffic may eventually be expanded to use four lanes of the Rowe bridge; the third northbound lane was opened on May 23, 2019, and a temporary non-motorized multi-use path on the northbound shoulder was opened in August 2019.

Ruth L. Griffin Bridge

The second Little Bay Bridge, with a capacity of four traffic lanes, is officially the Ruth L. Griffin Bridge, named for a 20-year member of the Executive Council of New Hampshire. It was built to temporarily ease traffic congestion across the Rowe bridge, and was completed in November 2013. It is physically located between the Rowe bridge and the General Sullivan Bridge.

Once the Griffin bridge was completed, all traffic from the Rowe bridge was moved to it, so the Rowe bridge could be closed for renovations. The Griffin bridge continued to handle all traffic for several years due to realignment of the nearby U.S. Route 4 interchange. Northbound traffic returned to the Rowe bridge in December 2018. All four lanes of the Griffin bridge were opened to southbound traffic on July 20, 2019. A new merge pattern just north of the bridge, better enabling traffic from U.S. Route 4 and the Spaulding Turnpike to utilize the four southbound lanes, went into effect in April 2020.

General Sullivan Bridge

The General Sullivan Bridge is a deck truss bridge, with a through truss span to accommodate ship traffic, that formerly carried the roads that now travel over the Little Bay Bridges. The bridge was named for John Sullivan, a Revolutionary War general, Governor of New Hampshire, and delegate to the Continental Congress, who was from nearby Somersworth. Little Bay had previously been spanned by a railroad and automobile bridge, which had been completed in December 1873 and began carrying rail traffic in February 1874; after 60 years of service, it was dismantled in February 1935. Near the Newington-side abutment, the 1873-constructed Newington Railroad Depot still stands.

The General Sullivan Bridge was completed in 1934, and dedicated on September 5 that year. Constructed at a cost of $1 million, it was a toll bridge for its first 15 years of use, with the tolls being abolished on November 1, 1949. The bridge has been closed to vehicular traffic since the opening of the second span of the Rowe bridge in 1984.

After being closed to vehicular traffic, the General Sullivan Bridge was used by pedestrians and cyclists, as the Little Bay Bridges did not have facilities for foot traffic. The bridge had long been a popular fishing spot. In 2010 and 2015, fencing was installed to limit access to specific areas of the bridge, due to deteriorating conditions. In September 2018, the bridge was permanently closed to pedestrians and cyclists, due to a lack of maintenance causing unsafe conditions.

In popular culture
The General Sullivan Bridge, although it was not named, appeared in a 1997 episode of WWF Monday Night Raw, when Steve Austin threw the WWE Intercontinental Championship belt (then belonging to The Rock) into the river below.

Future plans
While the General Sullivan Bridge "is nationally significant... as an early and highly influential example of continuous truss highway design in the United States", its future is uncertain. The Coast Guard regards it as a navigation hazard and favors its removal. Bridge proponents cite its eligibility for listing on the National Register of Historic Places. As of July 2018, restored pedestrian and bicycle access to the bridge was planned for the summer of 2022. As of January 2020, "the state’s plan now is to build a new bridge on the existing piers". The new bridge would be a  multi-use path.

Photographs

Capt. John F. Rowe Bridge

General Sullivan Bridge

See also

References

Further reading

External links

Spaulding Turnpike Newington-Dover Project Website by NHDOT

Bridges completed in 1966
Bridges completed in 1984
Bridges in Rockingham County, New Hampshire
Bridges in Strafford County, New Hampshire
Road bridges in New Hampshire
Buildings and structures in Dover, New Hampshire
Newington, New Hampshire
U.S. Route 4
Bridges of the United States Numbered Highway System
Girder bridges in the United States